Far Traveller was a gaming magazine published by FASA from 1982 to 1983. Far Traveller was a magazine approved for use with Traveller, published in place of the previous High Passage.

Publication history
FASA replaced High Passage with a new J. Andrew Keith magazine called Far Traveller, which began publication in October 1982. FASA's Traveller support ended with Far Traveller #2 ( January 1983), although a third issue was promised but was never published; the Keiths moved their Traveller writing to a new company called Gamelords.

Reception
William A. Barton reviewed the first issue of Far Traveller in The Space Gamer No. 61. Barton commented that "Overall, Far Traveller looks like it should be an excellent addition to the world of Traveller products.  High Passage will be missed, but Far Traveller should go a long way to fill the void."

Reviews
Different Worlds #34 (May/June, 1984)

References

Defunct magazines published in the United States
Hobby magazines published in the United States
Magazines established in 1982
Magazines disestablished in 1983
Magazines published in Chicago
Role-playing game magazines
Traveller (role-playing game)